Idin (also Romanized as ‘Īdīn and ‘Eydīn) is a village in Ashrestaq Rural District, Yaneh Sar District, Behshahr County, Mazandaran Province, Iran. At the 2006 census, its population was 210, in 53 families.

References 

Populated places in Behshahr County